Jean Larrivée is a Canadian luthier specializing in guitars and the founder of Larrivée Guitars.
He was originally trained as an auto mechanic, but began making guitars in 1967.

Early career
He was originally trained as a luthier by Edgar Mönch in 1967, who had recently arrived as an immigrant to Canada.

Notable students and apprentices
 Grit Laskin
 Linda Manzer
 Sergei de Jonge

References

External links
 Larrivee Guitars website
 Larrivee guitars on the Guitarbench.com guitar database
NAMM oral history interview, July 28, 2007

Canadian luthiers
Businesspeople from Quebec
Living people
Year of birth missing (living people)